The Royal Jubilee Medal is an official medal of the sub-national Kingdom of Gbi Traditional Area Hohoe, the largest in the Volta Region of Ghana. The Grand Master of the Order is the traditional Ruler Togbe Ngoryfia Céphas Kosi Bansah Traditional, Spiritual and Honorable King of the Ewe, Head of the Royal House of Bansah, President of the Crown Council of the Kingdom, called "The Eagle of Hohoe" (since 1992).

The Royal Jubilee Medal was established on the Occasion of the 30th Jubilee of Togbe Ngoryfia Céphas Kosi Bansh's accession on the Throne in the sub-national Kingdom of Gbi Traditional Area Hohoe. It has only one Class and is restricted to 150 awardings worldwide in 2022.

Notable recipients

Christoph Glogger, Mayor of Bad Dürkheim

Jutta Steinruck, Mayor of Ludwigshafen

Dr. Peter Kurz, Lord mayor of Mannheim

Gallery

See also

 Royal and Dynastic Order of the Eagle of Hohoe
 Orders, decorations, and medals of Ghana

References

External links
 Home
 TOGBUI NGORYIFIA CÉPHAS KOSI BANSAH ▲▲▲ KÖNIG VON HOHE GBI TRADITIONAL GHANA

Orders, decorations, and medals of Ghana